The 1999 Texaco/Havoline 200 was the tenth round of the 1999 CART FedEx Champ Car World Series season, held on July 11, 1999, at Road America in Elkhart Lake, Wisconsin. Michael Andretti won his 32nd and final Pole Position of his career.

Report

Race 
The race was red-flagged on the first lap as the start saw six drivers being taken out in two separate incidents at different locations of the track. The race was restarted entirely, with the drivers involved being in their spare cars. Michael Andretti got a jump on the others from pole, but Juan Pablo Montoya simply drove around him at the first corner and took the lead. Andretti ran second early on, but he lost the spot to teammate Christian Fittipaldi at the first round of pit stops. Andretti wasted no time in passing his teammate for the second, with Adrián Fernández doing the same soon after and then attacking Andretti. That did not work out as Adrián Fernández spun and dropped back to fifth. By now, Montoya had a 12-second lead, but he started suffering from gearbox problems and started to lose time. Fittipaldi got the better of Andretti on the second pit stop as well, and kept the place this time, before closing Montoya down. He closed to within 1.5 seconds to Montoya, but the latter was able to nurse the car and maintain the gap. The third round of stops changed nothing, and Montoya was able to keep Fittipaldi at arm's length and nurse the car, but the gearbox broke entirely with seven laps left. Fittipaldi was handed the lead and took his first career win ahead of teammate Andretti, with Fernández completing the podium.

Classification

Race

Caution flags 
No cautions.

Lap Leaders

Point standings after race

References 

Texaco Havoline 200